HMS Ormonde was a 50-gun fourth rate ship of the line of the Royal Navy, built at Woolwich Dockyard to the 1706 Establishment of dimensions, and launched on 18 October 1711.

In September 1715, she was renamed Dragon. The next year, commanded by Streynsham Master, she was assigned to the Mediterranean Sea.

In 1717, still under Master, she served with Admiral Byng's force in the Baltic Sea, capturing the Swedish Fildrim on 28 June.

Between 1718 and 1725, now commanded by Thomas Scott, she served mainly off Newfoundland and in the Mediterranean.

In 1726, Dragon was assigned to the West Indies station, where Scott would die 25 September, replaced by Perry Mayne.

In June 1727, still on West Indies station, Mayne in turn was replaced by F. Hume.

Ormonde (Dragon) finished her career in the West Indies, serving until 1733, when she was broken up.

Notes

References

Lavery, Brian (2003) The Ship of the Line - Volume 1: The development of the battlefleet 1650-1850. Conway Maritime Press. .

Ships of the line of the Royal Navy
1710s ships